The 2016 Northern Territory general election was held on Saturday 27 August 2016 to elect all 25 members of the Legislative Assembly in the unicameral Northern Territory Parliament.

Legislation was passed in February 2016 to change the voting method of single-member electorates from full-preferential voting to optional preferential voting. Electoral districts were redistributed in 2015. The election was conducted by the Northern Territory Electoral Commission, an independent body answerable to Parliament.

The one-term incumbent Country Liberal Party (CLP) minority government, led by Chief Minister Adam Giles, was defeated by the Opposition Labor Party, led by Opposition Leader Michael Gunner. The CLP suffered the worst defeat of a sitting government in the history of the Territory, and one of the worst defeats of a sitting government in Australian history. It was the first time that a sitting Northern Territory government was defeated after only one term. From 11 seats at dissolution (and 16 at the 2012 election), the CLP suffered the worst election performance in its history, winning only two seats—those of second-term MPs Gary Higgins (the only survivor of the Giles cabinet) and Lia Finocchiaro. Labor won 18 seats, in the process winning the third-largest majority government in Territory history, and the second-largest since the Territory was granted self-government in 1978. Independents won five seats. Although the independent MPs outnumbered the CLP MPs, on official advice the CLP was recognised as the official opposition.

Additionally, Giles lost his Alice Springs-based seat of Braitling to Labor, making him only the second Chief Minister/Majority Leader to lose his own seat at an election. Labor also took Katherine, previously the safest seat in the Territory, off the CLP.  It was the first election that saw Labor win seats in Katherine and inner Alice Springs.

With the overall result beyond doubt, Gunner had himself, Natasha Fyles, and Nicole Manison sworn in as an interim three-person government on 31 August until the full Gunner Ministry could be sworn in on 12 September. The CLP's two surviving MPs, Higgins and Finocchiaro, became leader and deputy leader of the CLP on 2 September.

Despite Labor's massive majority following the 2016 election, the new Labor government re-appointed CLP-turned-independent Kezia Purick as Speaker of the Northern Territory Legislative Assembly for another term.

Results

|}

Independents: Robyn Lambley (Araluen), Terry Mills (Blain), Kezia Purick (Goyder), Gerry Wood (Nelson), Yingiya Mark Guyula (Nhulunbuy)

Labor went into the election as unbackable favourites, with Northern Territory opinion polls indicating a massive swing against the CLP—as much as 19 points, by at least one account (see below).  Giles later admitted that he'd known almost as soon as the writs were dropped that the CLP would not be reelected, but felt he had to keep up appearances to maintain morale.

As expected, Labor swept the CLP from power in a massive landslide.  It won 58.5 percent of the two-party vote on a swing of 14.3 percentage points, the largest two-party swing on record for a Territory election.  It is only the second time Territory Labor has won a majority of the two-party vote at an election.

By only four percentage points, Labor won the third-largest majority government in Territory history, with 72 percent of the 25-seat Assembly.  This was only bettered by Labor's landslide victory in 2005, when Labor won 19 seats (76 percent of the seats), and the first election in 1974, in which the CLP only faced two independents as opposition.

ABC election analyst Antony Green called the election for Labor at 6:41 pm Darwin time, less than an hour after counting began.  Giles phoned Gunner to concede defeat just after 9 pm, and Gunner publicly claimed victory an hour later.  Only one seat had been definitively called for the CLP by Sunday morning, with a second called on Monday morning.

The CLP lost a number of seats on swings of well over 10 percentage points. In some seats, the CLP suffered swings virtually unheard of in Australian politics.  For example, Bess Price, one of several indigenous CLP members elected in 2012, was routed in her seat of Stuart, suffering a swing of nearly 31 points to Labor—easily the largest swing of the election (not counting swings picked up by former CLP members contesting as independents). The CLP was all but wiped out in the Darwin/Palmerston area, losing all but one seat there. This was all the more remarkable since Labor had historically run dead in Palmerston for most of the Legislative Assembly's existence. Labor picked up two Palmerston seats in its 2005 landslide, only to lose them both to the CLP in 2008.

By Sunday morning, Giles was trailing in his own seat of Braitling.  He'd gone into the election sitting on a seemingly insurmountable majority of 19.6 percent after the redistribution. However, the ABC showed him trailing Labor challenger Dale Wakefield with counting still underway.  Ultimately, Labor took the seat on a swing of almost 20 points, making Giles only the second Majority Leader/Chief Minister and the third major-party leader in the Territory to lose his own seat. With former CLP member-turned-independent Robyn Lambley having retained the other Alice Springs-based seat, Araluen as an independent, Giles' defeat meant that the CLP was completely shut out in its other traditional stronghold for the first time ever.

Also of note, former Deputy Chief Minister Willem Westra van Holthe lost his seat of Katherine to Labor. Going into the election, Westra van Holthe sat on a majority of 22.3 percent, making Katherine the safest seat in the Territory.  However, Westra van Holthe's primary vote almost halved, enabling Labor challenger Sandra Nelson to oust him by 33 votes. Earlier, Green said that it would "truly be a disaster" for the CLP if both Braitling and Katherine fell to Labor; neither had ever been won by Labor before 2016. The only blemish on Labor's otherwise massive victory came when deputy leader Lynne Walker, who had been tipped to become Deputy Chief Minister, lost in her own seat of Nhulunbuy to independent candidate Yingiya Mark Guyula by a mere eight votes. However, Labor left open the possibility of challenging the result.

Although the CLP had fewer members than the independents, Territory Solicitor-General Sonia Brownhill  advised that the independents should not be recognised as the Official Opposition because they did not have a realistic chance of forming an alternative government.  While Labor was the only party to win enough seats for official party status in the legislature, Gunner promised that the CLP would be properly resourced as an opposition.

With the overall result beyond doubt, Gunner had himself, Natasha Fyles, and Nicole Manison sworn in as an interim three-person government on 31 August until the full Gunner Ministry could be sworn in on 12 September.

On 2 September, Higgins became leader of what remained of the CLP, and hence Opposition Leader, with Finocchiaro as his deputy.

Post-election pendulum

Seats changing hands

Members in italics did not re-contest their Legislative Assembly seats at this election.

Candidates
Sitting members are listed in bold. Successful candidates are highlighted in the relevant colour. Where there is possible confusion, an asterisk is used.

Opinion polling
An opinion poll conducted by ReachTEL and commissioned by The Australian which surveyed 1036 residents via robocall on the afternoon of Sunday 1 March 2015, a month after the 2015 CLP leadership spill, across all 18 electorates in Darwin, Palmerston and Alice Springs indicated a 17.6-point two-party swing against the incumbent CLP government since the last election.  Had this been repeated at a general election, it would have delivered a comprehensive victory for Labor.

The Northern Territory News commissioned its own MediaReach poll in late July 2016, more than a week before the writ was formally dropped.  It showed the two-party swing had further widened to 19 points in favour of the opposition Labor Party. Had this been repeated at a general election, it would have resulted in a landslide Labor victory.  It also showed Labor leading by substantial margins in the Darwin area, including a 63–37 percent two-party margin in Palmerston, a conservative bastion for most of the last four decades.  This suggested that the CLP was in danger of losing most, if not all, of its parliamentary representation in the Darwin/Palmerston area.  The same poll also showed that Labor leader Michael Gunner had a substantial lead over Giles as preferred chief minister.

In what proved to be a warning sign, the 2016 federal election saw a 7.4 percent swing to Labor, which would have been more than enough for a Labor victory had this been repeated at a general election.  The CLP also suffered large swings in the Territory's two seats.  Solomon, which is largely coextensive with the Darwin/Palmerston area, saw CLP incumbent Natasha Griggs rolled by Labor challenger Luke Gosling on a swing of more than seven points.  Warren Snowdon, the Labor member for Lingiari, which covers the rest of the Territory, picked up a healthy swing of seven points.

Voting intention

 3% of voters recorded their intentions as undecided.
 13.7% of voters were initially undecided as to their primary vote, with the CLP on 30.2%, the ALP on 38.0%, the Greens on 6.9% and others on 11.3%. Asked which party the 13.7% undecided had "even a slight leaning" for: 30.8% to the CLP, 27.9% to the ALP, 13.7% to the Greens and 27.7% to others. As a proportion of 13.7%, this equated to CLP 4.2%, ALP 3.8%, Greens 1.9%, other 3.8%, which have been added to the initial totals in the table.

Timing
The timing of the election is dictated by the Northern Territory Electoral Act. Section 23 of the Act fixes polling day as the fourth Saturday in August of the fourth year after the previous election (unless that election had been an extraordinary election). The last election was in 2012, and was a regular election. Therefore, the next election was scheduled for Saturday, 27 August 2016.

An earlier election was possible in the event that a motion of no confidence in the government was passed by the assembly. Section 24 of the act states that an early election can be called if a motion of no confidence in the NT government is passed by the assembly, and no new government can secure the assembly's confidence within eight days. The original confidence motion must be tabled with at least three days' notice. Alternatively, section 25 mandates an early election if the assembly rejects an appropriation bill.

Background
The Terry Mills-led CLP opposition defeated the Paul Henderson-led Labor government at the 2012 election, winning 16 of 25 seats.

Adam Giles was elected by the CLP party-room to replace Mills as Chief Minister and CLP leader less than a year later at the 2013 CLP leadership ballot. Giles became the first indigenous head of government of an Australian state or territory.

Resulting from the 2015 CLP leadership ballot on 2 February, the possibility of a confidence motion being put to the assembly was raised by Willem Westra van Holthe to take over the leadership from Giles, however Giles managed to retain the leadership and continued to govern.

Five months later, in July 2015, CLP member Kezia Purick defected from the party, the fourth parliamentarian to leave the CLP since the previous election, reducing the CLP to minority government. Giles raised the possibility of an early election on 20 July stating that he would "love" to call a snap poll, but that it was "pretty much impossible to do". Crossbenchers dismissed the notion of voting against a confidence motion to bring down the government.

Redistribution
A redistribution of the Northern Territory's electoral boundaries commenced in February 2015, with draft boundaries released in June. Once finalised, these boundaries would apply to the 2016 general election.

On 16 June 2015, the NTEC released their proposals for redistribution. Major changes included in the proposal were: 
A new seat called Spillett would be created in the northern parts of Palmerston
Alice Springs would lose a seat due to its current three seats being under quota, with Araluen merging with the large rural seat of Stuart to form a new seat, Battarbee
Two seats would be renamed: Nhulunbuy would become Milirrpum, and Wanguri would become Somerville
The two retained districts of Drysdale and Fong Lim would lose over half of their existing electorates
More minor changes would be made to the boundaries of all but five of the remaining districts

A period of thirty days in which interested parties and individuals could lodge objections ended on 16 July 2015.

On 16 September 2015, the NTEC released their final report into boundaries for 2016 and beyond. The changes that occurred were less severe than those proposed in June:
The proposed new seat of Spillett was created to the north of Palmerston but has a slightly different composition
Araluen and Stuart were retained with the division of Greatorex being abolished. Its electors were transferred to Araluen, Braitling and Namatjira 
The seats of Nhulunbuy and Wanguri were retained
Drysdale and Fong Lim saw smaller changes than previously proposed
Four seats remained completely unchanged by the proposals – Karama, Katherine, Nightcliff and Sanderson

Following the completion of the final report, it was tabled in the assembly on 16 September 2015.

Election timetable
8 August – Issue of the writ
10 August – Close of electoral roll
12 August – Close of candidate nominations
15 August – Postal and early voting commences
27 August – Election day
31 August – Giles Ministry resigns, interim Gunner Ministry sworn in
5 September – A recount is held in five seats where the winning margin is fewer than 100 votes (Blain, Braitling, Karama, Katherine and Nhulunbuy)
9 September – Deadline for the receipt of postal votes
12 September – The writ was returned to the Administrator and the result formally declared

Retiring MPs

Country Liberal
Matt Conlan MLA (Greatorex) – announced retirement 17 March 2015
John Elferink MLA (Port Darwin) – announced retirement 19 November 2015
Dave Tollner MLA (Fong Lim) – lost preselection for Spillett 28 November 2015

Independent
Alison Anderson MLA (Namatjira) – elected as CLP; announced retirement 3 August 2016
Nathan Barrett MLA (Blain) – elected as CLP; announced retirement 12 June 2016

Electoral pendulum
The following pendulum is known as the Mackerras pendulum, invented by psephologist Malcolm Mackerras.  The pendulum works by lining up all of the seats held in the Legislative Assembly according to the percentage point margin they are held by on a two-party-preferred basis. This is also known as the swing required for the seat to change hands. Given a uniform swing to the opposition or government parties, the number of seats that change hands can be predicted.

Pre-election pendulum
Incumbent members who have become and remained an independent since the 2012 election are indicated in grey.

Members listed listed in italics did not re-contest their seat at the election.

See also
Members of the Northern Territory Legislative Assembly, 2012–2016
Members of the Northern Territory Legislative Assembly, 2016–2020

References

External links
 Northern Territory Electoral Commission
 ABC Elections: 2016 Northern Territory Election

Elections in the Northern Territory
2016 elections in Australia
2010s in the Northern Territory
August 2016 events in Australia